The Fall River Sandstone is a geologic formation in Nebraska. It preserves fossils dating back to the Cretaceous period.

See also

 List of fossiliferous stratigraphic units in Nebraska
 Paleontology in Nebraska

References
 

Sandstone formations of the United States
Cretaceous geology of Nebraska
Cretaceous geology of Wyoming